Invid Invasion may refer to:

A title used in several works of the Robotech fictional universe:
 The first episode of the third season, see List of Robotech episodes
 The fictional event, see Third Robotech War
 The #10 novel, see Robotech (novels)
 Robotech: Invasion, a video game